Travels is a 1988 nonfiction book by Michael Crichton that details how he abandoned his medical education at Harvard Medical School, moved to Los Angeles, and began his professional writing career with The Great Train Robbery (1975). After this book became a movie starring Sean Connery, Crichton undertook a variety of international adventures and experimented with mysticism, including out-of-body experiences, astral projection, and fortune-telling. It is his fourth, final, and most famous non-fiction book.

Contents
 Medical Days (1965-1969)
 Travels (1971-1986)
  Sex and Death in L.A.
  Psychiatry
  Bangkok
  Bonaire
  Pahang
  An Elephant Attacks
  Kilimanjaro
  Pyramid of the Magicians
  My Father's Death
  Ireland
  London Psychics
  Baltistan
  Shangri-La
  Sharks
  Gorillas
  An Extinct Turtle
  Cactus Teachings
  Jamaica
  A Human Light Show
  They
  Seeing Headhunters
  Life on the Astral Plane
  New Guinea
  Spoon Bending
  Seeing Auras
  An Entity
  Direct Experience
 Postscript: Skeptics at Caltech

External links
Article on how Crichton came to write his famous book, 'Travels'
Crichton answers questions about Travels

Books by Michael Crichton
1988 non-fiction books
Alfred A. Knopf books
Astral projection in popular culture